Springhill is a city in northern Webster Parish, Louisiana, United States. The population was 5,279 at the 2010 census, a decrease of 160 since 2000. Springhill is part of the Minden Micropolitan Statistical Area though it is thirty miles north of Minden, the seat of government of Webster Parish. The Springhill population is 34 percent African American, compared to 25 percent minority in 2000.

The 1979 film Five Days from Home, which was directed by and starred George Peppard, was filmed primarily in Springhill. Peppard's third wife, Sherry Boucher, is a Springhill native; her father, Jesse L. Boucher was a businessman and developer who served as mayor of Springhill.

History

Webster Parish was first permanently settled about 1818 near Overton south of the parish seat of Minden. According to genealogical findings, William Farmer, Samuel Monzingo, J. A. Byrnes, and Joseph Murrell were the first settlers in the area. These settlers formed an area that was initially referred to informally as "Piney Woods."  In 1894, though still unincorporated, what would eventually become Springhill took the name "Barefoot, Louisiana" on the notions of a Mrs. Maxwell, who assigned the name based on her observations that many men in the community went to work without shoes. The town that is today Springhill was finally incorporated in 1902. The first mayor was N.B. Taylor, who followed a year thereafter by B.D. Wilson. Peter Modisette was the mayor from 1914 to 1925.

Springhill City Hall is located opposite the Springhill Civic Center, a meeting hall which cost $500,000 and was financed in the late 1960s under a voter-approved bond issue, with millage taxes levied against property owners.

More recent mayors included Ed Shultz (1942–1954), Charles McConnell (1954–1958), Jesse L. Boucher (1958–1962), James Allen (1962–1974), M. A. Gleason, Jr. (1974–1978), Johnny D. Herrington (1978–1986 and 1995–2006), a brother-in-law of Boucher, James Curtis Smith (1987–1994), and Carroll Breaux, who assumed office on January 1, 2007. Breaux, an Independent, is the first non-Democrat to serve as Springhill mayor. He unseated Herrington, 973–782, in the nonpartisan blanket primary held on September 30, 2006. Breaux was succeeded in 2019 by another No Party mayor, Ray Huddleston.

Timber industry

Springhill's close association with the timber industry began in 1896 with the arrival of the Pine Woods Lumber Company. Springhill prospered from timber and for a time was a boomtown. The Pine Woods Lumber Company went out of business during the Great Depression, and the population of Springhill dwindled.  The Pine Woods Lumber Company facility was purchased by the Frost Lumber Company, which sold to Springhill Lumber Company. The Springhill Lumber Company later became Anthony Forest Products, which remained in Springhill until 1972.

The most significant local economic force, however, was the establishment of a massive pulp paper mill in 1937 by International Paper Company.  The construction of the paper mill greatly expanded the regional economic importance of Springhill and further cemented ties to the timber industry.  Though technically within the town of Cullen just south of Springhill, the facility was regionally known as the "Springhill paper mill."  The later addition of a wood products plant and container (box) plant by International Paper further established Springhill as one of the most important manufacturing and processing centers in northern Louisiana.  In 1979, International Paper closed the paper mill, which along with a significant general downturn in the petroleum industry caused a deterioration of the local economy.  Though the paper mill closed, International Paper maintained its wood products and container-producing facilities.  During 2006–2007, IP sold the wood products plant to its main rival, Georgia Pacific and liquidated its significant land holdings in the Springhill area. The container division, often called the "box plant", remains the last remnant of International Paper in Springhill.

A new plant in north Springhill is Tucker Lumber Company, a sawmill, crosstie trimming, and end-plate facility.

On March 31, 2014, Governor Bobby Jindal announced that IntegriCo Composites, a company that manufactures railroad cross ties, will open a plant in Springhill that will employ three hundred persons. Jindal called the new plant part of a "manufacturing renaissance" in Louisiana. State Senator Robert Adley of Benton, said that Springhill "so desperately needs and deserves" these jobs. He added that the community has "taken some hard licks during the past years. This will create some economic momentum for the town and the region."

Springhill today

After it purchased the plywood mill from International Paper, Georgia Pacific closed the plant. Another major employer, Trane, which manufactures air-conditioning components, relocated to Mexico.

There has been an expansion of the retail and service industries and improvement in the municipal infrastructure. Downtown Main Street has been revitalized with aesthetic improvements, new businesses, and renovation of the Springhill branch of the Webster Parish Library. The city still has a theater, The Spring.

A formerly abandoned grocery store was converted into the Frank Anthony Community Activity Center, which hosts community events and occasional concerts by such music icons as Willie Nelson and Springhill native Joe Stampley.

Education

Springhill has a high school, North Webster High School, formerly the Springhill Jr./Sr. High School, which housed grades seven through twelve in prior to 2011.  After budget cuts and consolidation, the school now enrolls ninth through twelfth- graders from all of northern Webster Parish. All former Springhill Junior High pupils now attend school in Sarepta at North Webster Junior High School. Elementary schools, Browning Elementary and Brown Middle, remained the same after consolidation. PK-5th grade pupils in Springhill still attend these schools.

The former campus of the Georgia Howell Elementary School, built in 1956, has been closed because of unsafe building conditions. The pupils formerly assigned there now attend Browning or Brown Middle.

Geography

Demographics

2020 census

As of the 2020 United States census, there were 4,801 people, 2,270 households, and 1,171 families residing in the city.

2000 census
As of the census of 2000, there were 5,439 people, 2,258 households, and 1,485 families residing in the city. The racial makeup of the city was 73.49% White, 25.13% African American, 0.20% Native American, 0.22% Asian, 0.04% Pacific Islander, 0.26% from other races, and 0.66% from two or more races. 0.79% of the population were Hispanic or Latino of any race.

There were 2,258 households, out of which 26.5% had children under the age of 18 living with them, 46.6% were married couples living together, 15.4% had a female householder with no husband present, and 34.2% were non-families. 31.1% of all households were made up of individuals, and 17.2% had someone living alone who was 65 years of age or older. The average household size was 2.34 and the average family size was 2.90.

In the city, the population was spread out, with 23.8% under the age of 18, 8.7% from 18 to 24, 23.8% from 25 to 44, 22.2% from 45 to 64, and 21.6% who were 65 years of age or older. The median age was 40 years. For every 100 females, there were 85.3 males. For every 100 females age 18 and over, there were 81.8 males.

The median income for a household in the city was $27,102, and the median income for a family was $35,540. Males had a median income of $29,757 versus $17,750 for females. The per capita income for the city was $16,447. About 14.6% of families and 20.2% of the population were below the poverty line, including 29.6% of those under age 18 and 12.6% of those age 65 or over.

Culture
 Springhill hosts an annual Lumberjack Festival, which includes crafts, Kids Corner, Louisiana food, live music, and a parade. Although we are not the Springhill Lumberjacks anymore we still have it, which has been relocated to the Frank Anthony Park.

Notable people
 Devin White - All-American linebacker at LSU and Super Bowl champion for the Tampa Bay Buccaneers, graduate of North Webster High School
 Trace Adkins – Country music singer
 Bruce M. Bolin – former legislator and judge; born in Springhill in 1950 
 Drayton R. Boucher – former member of the Louisiana House of Representatives and the Louisiana State Senate from Springhill
 Savannah Smith Boucher – actress
 Sherry Boucher – former Hollywood actress and Realtor in Bossier Parish; formerly married to George Peppard
 Shannen W. Coffin – Georgetown University law school graduate who clerked on the federal bench. Former Deputy Assistant Attorney General of the United States.  Resigned in October 2007 as General Counsel for the Office of the Vice President of the United States, Richard B. Cheney.
 John David Crow – Winner of the 1957 Heisman Trophy. He played for eleven seasons in the National Football League and played in four NFL Pro Bowls. He also served as athletic director of Texas A&M University in College Station.
 Eugene Eason (1928–2007) – Republican member of the Louisiana House of Representatives from 1991 to 1992 and former member of the Springhill City Council.
 Charles Jacobs – judge of the Louisiana 26th Judicial District Court; former city attorney for Springhill
 Royce L. McMahen – veterinarian and sheriff of Webster Parish from 1980 to 1996, Democrat 
 John Willard "Jack" Montgomery, Sr. – Democratic member of the Louisiana State Senate from 1968 to 1972; preceded by and succeeded by Harold Montgomery, no relation.
 E. N. Payne (1873–1951) – state representative for Webster Parish from 1932 to 1936
 Dorothy Garrett Smith – first woman president of the Louisiana Board of Elementary and Secondary Education (1989–1990), BESE member (1987–1990), member of the Webster Parish School Board (1971–1987)
 Joe Stampley – Country music artist who headed the former "The Uniques" and was part of a duo with Moe Bandy. In 1976, Stampley had eight singles which charted in Billboard Magazine and was awarded "Billboard's Single Artist of the Year".
 John Stephens – first-round pick of the 1988 NFL Draft by the New England Patriots. 1988 NFL Offensive Rookie Of The Year and member of the Northwestern State University Football Hall Of Fame.
 Stanley R. Tiner (born 1942) – American journalist
 Steve Weddle – novelist and journalist, whose debut novel takes place in Springhill, Louisiana and Magnolia, Arkansas
 D. C. Wimberly (1917–2007) – Prisoner of war from 1944 to 1945 in Germany. He was liberated by the Russians and then escaped on May 9, 1945. He was subsequently an officer of American Ex-Prisoners of War, an organization based in Arlington, Texas, chartered by the U.S. Congress in 1942. A graduate of Northwestern State University in Natchitoches and Louisiana State University in Baton Rouge, Wimberly was principal of four Webster Parish schools.
John Corey Whaley – author of young adult literary fiction. Debut novel, Where Things Come Back, was published by Simon & Schuster in May 2011. He has since written two more novels, Noggin (published in April 2014) and Highly Illogical Behavior (published in May 2016).

References 

Cities in Louisiana
Cities in Webster Parish, Louisiana
Cities in the Ark-La-Tex